The Dnieper Reservoir is a water reservoir on the Dnieper river in Ukraine that was created by construction of the Dnieper Hydroelectric Station at Zaporizhzhia in 1932. The filling of the reservoir inundated the Dnieper Rapids. It is one of several reservoirs in the Dnieper reservoir cascade.

The reservoir is 129 km long and is located in the Dnipropetrovsk and Zaporizhzhia Oblasts. It stretches from the dam at Zaporizhzhia upstream to just below Dnipro city. It averages 3.2 km wide, and is 7 km at its widest. It is an average 8 meters deep and 53 meters at its deepest. The total water volume is 3.3 km³. The Samara Bay, stretching for approximately ten kilometers at the mouth of the Samara River, flows into the northern end of the reservoir.

References

Reservoirs built in the Soviet Union
Reservoirs in Ukraine
Geography of Dnipropetrovsk Oblast
Geography of Zaporizhzhia Oblast
Reservoirs of the Dnieper
1932 establishments in Ukraine